Kızılkaya  is a very small village in the Mersin Province, Turkey. It's part of Toroslar district (which is an intracity district within Greater Mersin). It is situated in the  Toros Mountains next to another village named Alanyalı. The population of Kızılkaya was only 37. as of 2012.

References

Villages in Toroslar District